El Pont de Bar is a municipality in the comarca of the Alt Urgell in Catalonia, Spain.

References

External links
  
 Government data pages 

Municipalities in Alt Urgell